Igor Radrezza (born 6 June 1993) is an Italian footballer who plays for  club Padova.

Biography
Born in Martina Franca, Apulia in Southern Italy, Radrezza started his career at Northern Italy club Padova. In 2012, he was signed by Castiglione in a temporary deal. On 2 July 2014 Radrezza was signed by Monza in a 1-year deal. On 20 December he was released. On 10 January 2015 he was signed by Renate in a 6-month deal.

On 18 July 2019, he signed with newly promoted Serie C club Reggiana. With Reggio Emilia's team, he won the Serie C play-offs. He played for them also in 2020–21 Serie B, in which the team got relegated.

On 29 July 2022, Radrezza returned to Padova on a two-year contract.

References

External links
 
 AIC profile (data by football.it) 

1993 births
Living people
Italian footballers
Association football forwards
Calcio Padova players
A.C. Monza players
A.C. Renate players
A.C.D. Campodarsego players
A.C. Crema 1908 players
A.C. Reggiana 1919 players
Serie B players
Serie C players
Serie D players